Let the Tempest Come is the second studio album by German melodic death metal band Neaera. It was released on 7 April 2006 through Metal Blade Records.

Track listing

Personnel 
Writing, performance and production credits are adapted from the album liner notes.

Neaera
 Benjamin Hilleke – vocals
 Stefan Keller – guitar
 Tobias Buck – guitar
 Benjamin Donath – bass
 Sebastian Heldt – drums

Guest musicians
 Kevin Otto (End of Days) – vocals on "God-Forsaken Soil"
 Jacob Bredahl (ex-Hatesphere) – vocals on "God-Forsaken Soil"

Production
 Jacob Hansen – recording, mixing, mastering

Artwork and design
  – layout
 Manuel Epker – photography

References

External links 
 
 Let the Tempest Come at Metal Blade Records
 Let the Tempest Come at Neaera's official website

2006 albums
Metal Blade Records albums
Neaera (band) albums